Tiszakécske is a district in north-eastern part of Bács-Kiskun County. Tiszakécske is also the name of the town where the district seat is found. The district is located in the Southern Great Plain Statistical Region.

Geography 
Tiszakécske District borders with Nagykőrös District, Cegléd District (Pest County) and Szolnok District (Jász-Nagykun-Szolnok County) to the north, Kunszentmárton District (Jász-Nagykun-Szolnok County) to the east, Csongrád District (Csongrád County) to the southeast, Kiskunfélegyháza District to the southwest, Kecskemét District to the west. The number of the inhabited places in Tiszakécske District is 5.

Municipalities 
The district has 1 town, 2 large villages and 2 villages.
(ordered by population, as of 1 January 2012)

The bolded municipality is city, italics municipalities are large villages.

Demographics

In 2011, it had a population of 23,582 and the population density was 58/km².

Ethnicity
Besides the Hungarian majority, the main minorities are the Roma (approx. 450), German (200) and Romanian (100).

Total population (2011 census): 23,582
Ethnic groups (2011 census): Identified themselves: 21,882 persons:
Hungarians: 20,957 (95.77%)
Gypsies: 429 (1.96%)
Others and indefinable: 496 (2.27%)
Approx. 1,500 persons in Tiszakécske District did not declare their ethnic group at the 2011 census.

Religion
Religious adherence in the county according to 2011 census:

Catholic – 12,252 (Roman Catholic – 12,200; Greek Catholic – 50);
Reformed – 2,387;
Evangelical – 52;
other religions – 258; 
Non-religious – 3,146; 
Atheism – 173;
Undeclared – 5,314.

Gallery

See also
List of cities and towns of Hungary

References

External links
 Postal codes of the Tiszakécske District

Districts in Bács-Kiskun County